Manimuthar is the name of four different rivers in Tamil Nadu, India:

 Manimuthar River (tributary of Thamirabarani)
 Manimuthar River (tributary of Pambar), a river of Tamil Nadu
 Manimuthar River (tributary of Vellar), a river of Tamil Nadu
 Thirumanimutharu River (tributary of Kaveri)

See also
 Manimuktha River, a tributary of the Vellar River in Tamil Nadu